Hungarian National Pentathlon Championship 1946 was the first case when a nationwide championship was held in Hungary to find the champion in pentathlon. Competitors were ranked by their results in all of the five competitions. László Karácson, the winner of the event became third in show jumping, fifth in épée fencing, first in pistol shooting, third in freestyle swimming and second in running. Only Csepel Sport Club was able to field a team, so they won the team championship.

Results

Men

Single

Team

Sources

1946 in modern pentathlon
1946 in Hungarian sport
Modern pentathlon in Europe
International sports competitions hosted by Hungary
Sport in Budapest
Modern pentathlon competitions